The Wings Over the Rockies Air and Space Museum (WOTR) is located on the former Lowry Air Force Base in Denver, Colorado, United States. The museum preserves the history of Lowry AFB's operations from 1938 to 1994 in its collections, archives, and research library. Features of the museum's collection include the USAF's B-1A Lancer and B-52 Stratofortress bombers and many other military and general aviation aircraft.

History 
From 1937 to 1994 Lowry Air Force Base, located on the eastern edge of Denver, was primarily a technical training center. It graduated more than 1.1 million enlisted members and officers in skills ranging from armament to photography, aiding the country's war efforts in World War II, the Korean War, the Vietnam War and the Cold War. From the 1980s Lowry Air Force Base remained one of Colorado's largest employers, with approximately 10,000 military and civilian men and women, providing an economic impact approaching $1 billion annually.

In 1994, the United States Air Force transferred Hangar 1 to a group of volunteers, who established Wings Over the Rockies Air and Space Museum. The Museum includes more than 182,000 square feet of hangar space and 50 iconic aircraft dating from 1939 to 1990.

In 1997, the Colorado State Legislature passed House Bill 1269 that made Wings Over the Rockies Air and Space Museum Colorado's official air and space museum, and the site of the Colorado Aviation Historical Society's Colorado Aviation Hall of Fame.

Exploration of Flight 
Exploration of Flight is a  campus located at Centennial Airport that serves as the second location of Wings Over the Rockies. While the Air and Space Museum focuses on the history and heritage of aviation, Exploration of Flight is home to future-focused aviation and space galleries and exhibits.

Aircraft exhibits

Military 

 Beechcraft UC-45 Expeditor 42-37496
 Boeing GB-52B Stratofortress 52-0005
 Cessna U-3 57-5894
 Convair F-102A Delta Dagger 56-0984
 Douglas B-18A Bolo 39-25
 General Dynamics FB-111A 68-0287
 Grumman F-14A Tomcat 159829
 Lockheed F-104C Starfighter 56-0910
 Lockheed T-33A 56-1710
 LTV A-7D Corsair II 73-0996 "Speedwell"
 Martin EB-57E Canberra 55-4293
 McDonnell F-101B Voodoo 58-0271
 McDonnell Douglas F-4E Phantom II 66-0286 "Julie"
 North American F-86H Sabre 53-1308
 North American F-100D Super Sabre 56-3417
 Northrop Grumman EA-6B Prowler
 Republic F-105D Thunderchief 60-0508
 Republic RF-84K Thunderflash 52-7266
 Rockwell B-1A 74-0160
 Schweizer TG-4 92-1541

Civilian 

 Adam M-309 (No. N309A)
 Aviat Special (No. N15JB)
 Ball-Bartoe Jetwing
 Christen Eagle II (No. N6LA)
 HL-20 Personnel Launch System on loan
 Learjet 24 (No. N241JA)
 McDonnell Apollo Boilerplate BP-1101A (No. 101), on loan from Smithsonian
 Murray Model T homebuilt helicopter, 1st to register in Colo. (No. N7222)
 Piper J3C-65 Cub (No. N42427)
 Rand Robinson KR-1 (No. N60BV)
 Schweizer SGS 1-24 Brigadoon, on loan from National Soaring Museum (No. N91888)
 Sky Star Aircraft Corp Kitfox
 Aerosport Woody Pusher (No. N393EA)

Other aircraft and related exhibits

 Space Station Freedom command module mockup built by Martin Marietta with CASIS' Science in Space Exhibit of the ISS
 U.S. NASA Astronauts with Colorado connections.
 Aircraft engine collection on display, both propeller and jet engines
 Nuclear weapons collection on display
 The Aviator Uniform Collection Exhibit Room.
 The Cold War Exhibit.
 The History of Avionics Exhibit Room.
 The Colorado Air National Guard Heritage Exhibit Room with Buckley Field and Buckley Air Force Base exhibits.
 The Colorado Aviation Historical Society's Heritage Hall featuring the Colorado Aviation Hall of Fame.
 Rocky Mountain Airways Flight 217 Memorial
 Former United Airlines DC-10 And Boeing 727-200 Cockpits, with open flight engineer post.
 Lucasfilm X-Wing Starfighter: a 3/4 scale replica built to promote the re-release of the first three Star Wars films in 1997.
 MaxFlight: a 360° full-motion flight simulator.

Education and services 
Wings Aerospace Academy is a tuition-free enrichment program that offers hands-on programs from the Museum and online core courses provided by Elevate Academy, a certified, multi-school district charter school. The focus of Wings Aerospace Academy is to offer hands-on aerospace-themed STEM experiences for students grades 6–11, with 12th grade planned to be added in the fall of 2019.
Teacher Flight Program – A unique aerospace program that encourages STEM teachers from across Colorado to become Teacher Envoys. It provides interested teachers with a free, 20 minute flight on a vintage 1940s Shearman biplane, and also provides other perks for their school, such as free entry tickets for all their students. The main goal of this program is to excite teachers and get them to inspire their students into undertaking an educational or professional career in the field of aviation and aerospace.
Summer Camp Programs – Four summer camps twice each summer offer insight into the aviation and aerospace industry. Camps include The Red Planet, Wings of All Types, The Good Old Days, and Rocket Science 101.
Technical Research Library – A library which contains over 15,000 book titles on aviation and aerospace and 800 titles covering ballooning, aviation and aerospace in English and other foreign languages. There are also extensive documents on Lowry Air Force Base history, including 1000 digital photos of the base. Other things from the library include retrospective airline tables, seat magazines and a collection of rare NASA documents.
Behind the Wings – A television show produced by Wings Over the Rockies.

See also 

 CAF Rocky Mountain Wing Museum, Grand Junction, Colorado
 Colorado Aviation Historical Society, Denver, Colorado
 Peterson Air and Space Museum, Colorado Springs, Colorado
 Pueblo Historical Aircraft Society, Pueblo, Colorado
 Pueblo Weisbrod Aircraft Museum, Pueblo, Colorado
 Spirit of Flight Center, Lafayette, Colorado
 Vintage Aero Flying Museum, Hudson, Colorado
Related lists
 List of aerospace museums

References

External links

 Wings Over the Rockies Air and Space Museum official website

Museums in Denver
Aerospace museums in Colorado
Military and war museums in Colorado